Hamzehabad (also Romanized as Hamzehābād) is a village in Langarud Rural District, Salman Shahr District, Abbasabad County, Mazandaran Province, Iran. At the 2006 census, its population was 1,707, in 491 families.

References 

Populated places in Abbasabad County